Enri Tafaj (born 22 May 1989) is an Albanian professional footballer who plays as a midfielder.

Club career
Tafaj began his career in 2007 with KF Tirana after working his way up through the youth setup at the club. He joined up with the first team during the winter break in the 2006–07 season. He made his league debut with KF Tirana in round 32 of the 2006–07 Albanian Superliga season on 12 May 2007. The match was against Teuta Durres at the Niko Dovana Stadium. Tafaj started the game and played the whole 90 minutes.

He made no further Superliga appearances for Tirana, and in January 2009 he joined KS Dajti on loan for the rest of the season to gain experience.

He then moved to FC Kamza, as KS Dajti had been renamed. He spent the early part of the 2010–11 season on loan at Laçi, but played only once, in a 7–1 defeat in the second leg of the Europa League first qualifying round match against Dnepr Mogilev. In the 2011–12 Superliga season, Tafaj played regularly for Kamza. He scored only once, a late consolation in a 2–1 defeat at Pogradeci. He took part in the relegation "play-out", as Kamza lost to Besa Tavaje to return to the First Division after just one season.

Tafaj returned to pre-season training with Kamza, but joined Superliga side Tomori Berat before the start of the 2012–13 season, where he was converted from midfielder to defender.

International career
Tafaj was called up to the Albania under-19 team for the Slovakia Cup tournament in April and May 2007, and also played twice in qualifying for the UEFA under-19 championships. In October 2008, he was called up to the Albania under-21 team to face their Macedonian counterparts, but took no part in the match.

References

External links
 Profile – FSHF

1989 births
Living people
Footballers from Tirana
Albanian footballers
Association football defenders
KF Tirana players
FC Kamza players
KF Laçi players
FK Tomori Berat players
FK Partizani Tirana players
FK Dinamo Tirana players
Kategoria Superiore players
Kategoria e Parë players